Raymond Arthur Gillen (May 12, 1959 – December 1, 1993) was an American rock singer. He is best known for his work with Badlands, in addition to his stint with Black Sabbath in the mid-1980s and recording most of the vocals on Phenomena's Dream Runner album.

Early life 
Gillen was born on May 12, 1959, in New York, but was raised in Cliffside Park, New Jersey. He was an only child and started singing while in high school. He played the New Jersey club circuit with various bands, including club bands Quest (1978–80), the punk rock influenced F-66 (1980–81), Savage, and, most notably, Vendetta and Harlette. In 1985, he joined Bobby Rondinelli's band, Rondinelli.

Career 
In 1986, Black Sabbath started touring for the Seventh Star album when after only a few shows, singer Glenn Hughes got into a fist-fight and lost his voice due to the related sinus and throat injuries. Gillen was offered the job to replace Hughes, which meant leaving Rondinelli to accept the offer. After finishing the Seventh Star tour, Black Sabbath recorded their next album The Eternal Idol with Gillen. However, due to mix of financial burden, writing difficulty (Bob Daisley was recruited for writing as Gillen turned out to be not much of a composer), mismanagement and miscommunication that plagued the band, Gillen and Black Sabbath drummer Eric Singer quit before the album was ever released. Gillen was eventually replaced by Tony Martin, and the vocal track of The Eternal Idol was hurriedly rerecorded note-for-note with Martin before the album was finally released in 1987. However, demo versions of The Eternal Idol featuring Gillen do exist on the bootleg circuit and on the 2010 deluxe Eternal Idol re-release. Also, in an interview Martin revealed that the sinister laugh heard on the track Nightmare is in fact Gillen's voice. The album was re-released on November 1, 2010, in Europe in a 2-disc expanded set including a bonus disc with Gillen's recording.

During the time of the Seventh Star tour, Gillen was asked by project director and co-producer Wilfried F. Rimensberger to join Mel Galley's Phenomena for the recording of the album Dream Runner, which features vocals from Glenn Hughes, John Wetton and Max Bacon. He recorded 4 tracks. Gillen is also featured in Phenomena's 'Did it all for Love' music video although he was not involved in the actual recording of that song.

After the Phenomena recordings, Gillen joined John Sykes (previously with Whitesnake, Thin Lizzy and a different band called Badlands) with the intention to form a new band Blue Murder. Gillen sang demos but parted company when Sykes decided to handle vocals himself.

Gillen then contacted Jake E. Lee (former Ozzy Osbourne guitarist) to form a band. In 1988, Gillen formed Badlands with Lee and recruited his friend Eric Singer with whom he had played in Black Sabbath. Gillen recorded three albums (Badlands, Voodoo Highway, and Dusk) with Badlands and the band toured from 1989 until 1992. They enjoyed moderate commercial success with their first two albums, but tensions between its band members, as well as problems with both management and their label Atlantic Records, hastened the band's demise. Gillen was briefly replaced by John West and Badlands dissolved soon afterwards. Their third album Dusk, which is made up of demos recorded shortly before Gillen's dismissal from the band, was released posthumously in 1998.

Following his split from Badlands, Gillen stayed in L.A. and was involved with two projects. He joined forces with drummer Randy Castillo and Iggy Pop band members Whitey Kirst and Craig Pike under the name Cockfight. He also joined the band Terriff, led by guitarist Joe Holmes, fresh off his stint with David Lee Roth on the A Little Ain't Enough tour. Gillen rehearsed with the group for several months before moving back to his native New York. He also went to form the band Sun Red Sun with old friends.

Illness and death 
In 1993, Wilfried F. Rimensberger was planning a remake of his first Metal Hammer Loreley Festival but this time specifically to stage Phenomena's first ever live performance, with Gillen on vocals. It was going to be the launch event for a series of concerts across Europe in 1994. Gillen called from New York and told Rimensberger in Munich that he had to bow out because he was too ill to perform.

Gillen died from an AIDS-related disease in a New York hospital on December 1, 1993. He first showed symptoms of the disease around 1990, and according to his Badlands bandmate Jake E. Lee, "in between the first and the second record, he started getting really thin and didn't look quite as healthy". Lee also claimed that he had not been aware of Gillen's diagnosis with AIDS until a meeting with then-Badlands manager Paul O'Neill, who threatened to tell Atlantic Records about Gillen's illness if he was fired by the band. Gillen reportedly denied it, saying to Lee, "Well, it's not true, so fuck him. Fire him." Lee concluded, "So we did fire him. And he did tell Atlantic Records that. And we got kind of screwed on the second record because of it. They wouldn't even give us tour-support money at all…but, yeah, Paul O'Neill fucked us on that."

Gillen was survived by a daughter, Ashley (born July 1984). He is buried at Fairview Cemetery in Fairview, New Jersey.

He was ranked at 100 on Hit Parader's Top 100 Metal Vocalists.

Discography

References

External links 
Ray Gillen at Black Sabbath Online
Tribute page on Hotshotdigital.com
Ray Gillen Biography from VH1.com
Ray Gillen at Find a Grave

1959 births
1993 deaths
American heavy metal singers
Savatage members
Black Sabbath members
Badlands (American band) members
Blue Murder (band) members
AIDS-related deaths in New York (state)
People from Cliffside Park, New Jersey
20th-century American singers
20th-century British musicians
Burials at Fairview Cemetery (Fairview, New Jersey)
20th-century American male singers
Blues rock musicians